The World Communion of Reformed Churches (WCRC) is the largest association of Calvinist churches in the world. It has 230 member denominations in 108 countries, together claiming an estimated 80 million people, thus being the fourth-largest Christian communion in the world after the Catholic Church, Eastern Orthodox Church, and the Anglican Communion. This ecumenical Christian body was formed in June 2010 by the union of the World Alliance of Reformed Churches (WARC) and the Reformed Ecumenical Council (REC).

Among the biggest denominations in the WCRC are the Church of South India, Presbyterian Church of East Africa, Presbyterian Church of Korea, Ethiopian Evangelical Church Mekane Yesus, Church of Jesus Christ in Madagascar, Federation of Swiss Protestant Churches, Protestant Church in Indonesia, Presbyterian Church (USA), Evangelical Church of Cameroon, Borneo Evangelical (SIB Malaysia) and the Protestant Church in the Netherlands. Its member denominations on the whole could be considered more liberal than the member denominations of the International Conference of Reformed Churches or the World Reformed Fellowship, which are also large ecumenical Calvinist organizations.

History
The WCRC traces its origins to 1875, with several unifying Reformed organizations emerging in London, England.

After a two-day meeting ending on 1 February 2006, Douwe Visser, president of the Reformed Ecumenical Council, and Clifton Kirkpatrick, president of the World Alliance of Reformed Churches, said in a joint letter to their constituencies, "We rejoice in the work of the Holy Spirit which we believe has led us to recommend that the time has come to bring together the work of the World Alliance of Reformed Churches and the Reformed Ecumenical Council into one body that will strengthen the unity and witness of Calvinist Christians."

After first calling the potential body "World Reformed Communion", this was modified into "World Communion of Reformed Churches".

A Uniting General Council of the WCRC, bringing the organization into existence, took place from 18–26 June 2010 at Calvin College, located at Grand Rapids, Michigan, United States. The council focused on the "Unity of the Spirit in the Bond of Peace" mentioned in Ephesians as its main theme, setting a tone of true mutual understanding and acceptance amongst member churches and associates, laying aside differences and other issues as they embark on this shared journey with one another as each seeks to discern the will of God and continue their struggle for justice and peace in the world. The World Communion of Reformed Churches has not taken a position on the issue of homosexuality but includes denominations that affirm same sex marriage.

Work

The 2010 Uniting General Council stated that the WCRC should be "called to communion and committed to justice." Its two main program offices are thus focused on these aspects, with theological work included with communion. The Theology and Communion office serves as coordinator for official dialogues with other religious organizations, organizes a bi-annual Global Institute of Theology, and brings Calvinist theological scholars together for various discussions. The Justice office promotes economic, ecological and human rights, basing much of its work on the Accra Confession, a statement adopted at the 2004 General Council of the World Alliance of Reformed Churches and re-endorsed at the 2010 Uniting General Council.

The WCRC also has a General Secretariat which includes the general secretary's office, the communications office and other organizational responsibilities. The current general secretary is Chris Ferguson, a minister from the United Church of Canada. Through the General Secretariat, the WCRC is able to promote dialogue between churches, advocate for causes on a global scale and support the activities of its member churches through various means.

The global headquarters of the WCRC are located in Hanover, Germany, with a North American non-profit subsidiary based in Grand Rapids, Michigan. Originally based in Geneva, Switzerland, which played host to John Calvin and earned a reputation as the "Protestant Rome", the group's Executive Committee announced on 8 November 2012, that they would relocate the headquarters to Hanover, Germany, by December 2013, due to overbearing financial strains caused by the high value of the Swiss franc.

General Secretary

Chris Ferguson is a pastor, theologian and social justice advocate from the United Church of Canada. He was elected to the post of general secretary of the World Communion of Reformed Churches in May 2014, entering office on 1 August 2014, for a seven-year term. Previously Ferguson served as the international ecumenical advisor for the Programme for Ecumenical Accompaniment in Colombia (2011–2014), the World Council of Churches representative to the United Nations (2006–2010), the World Council of Churches' representative to Jerusalem (2004–2006) and the executive minister of the United Church of Canada's Justice, Global and Ecumenical Relations Unit and ecumenical officer (2002–2004).

Members

This is a list of members of the World Communion of Reformed Churches as of February 2016:
Algeria
 Protestant Church of Algeria/Eglise Protestante d'Algérie
 Angola
 Evangelical Congregational Church in Angola/Igreja Evangélica Congregacional em Angola (IECA)
 Evangelical Reformed Church of Angola/Igreja Evangélica Reformanda de Angola (IERA)
 Argentina
 Evangelical Church of the River Plate/Iglesia Evangélica del Rio de la Plata
 Evangelical Congregational Church in Argentina/Iglesia Evangélica Congregacional
 Australia
 Congregational Federation of Australia
 Uniting Church in Australia
 Austria
 Evangelical Church of the Helvetic Confession in Austria/Evangelische Kirche HB (Reformiert) in Österreich
 Bangladesh
 Church of Bangladesh
 Evangelical Reformed Presbyterian Church in Bangladesh
 Belgium
 United Protestant Church in Belgium/Eglise Protestante Unie de Belgique/Verenigde Protestantse Kerk in Belgie
 Bolivia
 Evangelical Presbyterian Church in Bolivia/Iglesia Evangélica Presbiteriana en Bolivia
 Botswana
 Dutch Reformed Church in Botswana
 Brazil
 Evangelical Reformed Churches in Brazil/Igrejas Evangélicas Reformadas no Brasil
 Independent Presbyterian Church of Brazil/Igreja Presbiteriana Independente do Brasil
 United Presbyterian Church of Brazil/Igreja Presbiteriana Unida do Brasil
 Bulgaria
 Union of Evangelical Congregational Churches in Bulgaria/Sǎjuz na Evangelskite Sǎborni Cǎrkvi
 Burkina Faso
 Association of Reformed Evangelical Churches of Burkina Faso/Eglise evangelique reformee du Burkina Faso
 Cameroon
 Africa Protestant Church/Eglise protestante africaine
 Evangelical Church of Cameroon/Eglise évangélique du Cameroun
 Presbyterian Church in Cameroon/Eglise presbyterienne camerounaise
 Canada
 Christian Reformed Church in North America
 The Presbyterian Church in Canada/L'Église presbytérienne au Canada
 Reformed Church in America
 The United Church of Canada/L'Église unie du Canada
 Central African Republic
 Protestant Church of Christ the King/Eglise Protestante du Christ-Roi
 Chile
 Evangelical Presbyterian Church in Chile/Iglesia Evangélica Presbiteriana en Chile
 Presbyterian Church of Chile/Iglesia Presbiteriana de Chile
 China, Hong Kong
 The Hong Kong Council of the Church of Christ in China
 China, People's Republic of
 China Christian Council (associate member)
 Colombia
 Presbyterian Church of Colombia/Iglesia Presbiteriana de Colombia (Synodo presbiteriano)
 Congo, Democratic Republic of the
 Evangelical Community in the Congo/Communaute evangelique du Congo
 Presbyterian Community in the Congo/Communaute presbytérienne au Congo
 Presbyterian Community of Eastern Kasai/Communaute presbyterienne du Kasai oriental
 Presbyterian Community of Kinshasa/Communaute presbyterienne de Kinshasa
 Presbyterian Community of Western Kasai?/Reformed Presbyterian Community in Africa/Communauté presbytérienne au Kasai occidental/Communauté presbytérienne réformée en Afrique
 Reformed Community of Presbyterians/Communauté Réformée des Presbyteriens
 Congo, Republic of the
 Evangelical Church of Congo/Eglise évangélique du Congo
 Costa Rica
 Costa Rican Presbyterian Evangelical Church/Iglesia Evangélica Presbiteriana Costarricense
 Croatia
 Reformed Christian Church in Croatia/Reformirana Krscanska Crkva U Hrvatskoj
 Cuba
 Presbyterian Reformed Church in Cuba/Iglesia Presbiteriana-Reformada en Cuba
 Czech Republic
 Evangelical Church of Czech Brethren/Evangelische Kirche der Böhmischen Brüder/Ceskobratrská Cirkev Evangelická
 Denmark
 Reformed Synod of Denmark/Den reformerte Synode i Danmark
 Dominican Republic
 Christian Reformed Church in the Dominican Republic
 Dominican Evangelical Church/Iglesia Evangélica Dominicana
 Egypt
 Evangelical Church of Egypt (Synod of the Nile)/El-Kanisah El-Injiliyah
 El Salvador
 Reformed Calvinist Church of El Salvador/Iglesia Reformada Calvinista de El Salvador
 Equatorial Guinea
 Reformed Presbyterian Church of Equatorial Guinea/Iglesia Reformada Presbiteriana de Guinea Ecuatorial
 Ethiopia
 Ethiopian Evangelical Church Mekane Yesus/Ye Etiopia Wangelawit Betakristian Makane Yesus
 France
 Malagasy Protestant Church in France/Eglise Protestante Malgache/Fiangonana Protestanta Malagasy
 National Union of Protestant Reformed Evangelical Churches of FranceEglises protestantes réformées évangeliques de France (UNEPREF, formerly EREI)
 Reformed Church of Alsace and Lorraine/Eglise Réformée d'Alsace et de Lorraine
 United Protestant Church of France/Église protestante unie de France
 Germany
 Church of Lippe/Lippische Landeskirche
 Evangelical Reformed Church in Bavaria and Northwestern Germany (Synode evangelisch-reformierter Kirchen in Bayern und Nordwestdeutschland)
 Reformed Alliance/Reformierter Bund
 Evangelical Old-Reformed Church in Lower Saxony
 Ghana
 Evangelical Presbyterian Church, Ghana/Presbyteria Nyanyui Hame le Ghana
 Presbyterian Church of Ghana
 Greece
 Greek Evangelical Church/Helliniki Evangeliki Ekklesia
 Grenada
 Presbyterian Church in Grenada
 Guatemala
 National Evangelical Presbyterian Church of Guatemala/Iglesia Evangélica Nacional Presbiteriana de Guatemala
 Guyana
 Guyana Congregational Union
 Guyana Presbyterian Church
 Presbyterian Church of Guyana
 Honduras
 Christian Reformed Church of Honduras/Iglesia Cristiana Reformada de Honduras
 Hungary
 Reformed Church in Hungary/Magyarországi Református Egyház
 India
 Church of North India
 Church of South India
 The Congregational Church of India (Maraland)
 Evangelical Church of Maraland
 Presbyterian Church of India
 Reformed Presbyterian Church, North East India
 Indonesia
 Christian Church in Central Sulawesi
 Christian Church in Luwuk Banggai
 Christian Church in South Sulawesi
 Christian Church of Southern Sumatra (GKSBS)
 Christian Church of Sumba (GKS)
 Christian Churches of Java
 Christian Evangelical Church in Bolaang Mongondow?
 Christian Evangelical Church in Minahasa
 Christian Evangelical Church in Timor
 Church of Toraja Mamasa (GTM)
 The East Java Christian Church
 Evangelical Christian Church in Halmahera
 Evangelical Christian Church in West Papua
 Evangelical Church in Kalimantan
 Indonesia Christian Church
 Indonesian Protestant Church in Buol Toli-Toli
 Indonesian Protestant Church in Donggala
 Indonesian Protestant Church in Gorontalo
 Javanese Christian Churches (GKJ)
 Karo Batak Protestant Church (GBKP)
 Pasundan Christian Church
 Protestant Christian Church in Bali
 Protestant Church in Indonesia
 Protestant Church in the Moluccas
 Protestant Church in Southeast Sulawesi
 Protestant Church in West Indonesia
 Sangihe-Talaud Evangelical Church
 Toraja Church
Iran
 Synod of the Evangelical Church in Iran
 Ireland
 Presbyterian Church in Ireland
 Italy
 Waldensian Evangelical Church (Union of Methodist and Waldensian Churches)/Chiesa Evangelica Valdese
 Jamaica
 The United Church in Jamaica and the Cayman Islands
 Japan
 Church of Christ in Japan/Nippon Kirisuto Kyokai
 Korean Christian Church in Japan/Zainichi Daikan Kirisuto Kyokai Sokai
 Kenya
 Presbyterian Church of East Africa
 The Reformed Church of East Africa
 Kiribati
 Kiribati Protestant Church/Ekaretia ni Boretetanti i Kiribati
 Korea, Republic of
 Presbyterian Church of Korea (TongHap)
 Presbyterian Church in Korea (HapDongChunTong)/Hap Dong Jeong Tong/Hap Dong Chung Tong
 Presbyterian Church in the Republic of Korea/Ki Jang
 Presbyterian Church in Korea (Daeshin)/Dae Shin
 Latvia
 Reformed Church in Latvia/Evangeliska Reformatu-Braju Draudze
 Lebanon
 National Evangelical Synod of Syria and Lebanon
 The National Evangelical Union of Lebanon/Al-Ittihad Al Injili Al-Watani Fi Lubnan
 Union of the Armenian Evangelical Churches in the Near East/Մերձաւոր Արեւելքի Հայ Աւետարանական Եկեղեցիներու Միութիւն
 Lesotho
 Lesotho Evangelical Church/Kereke ea Evangeli Lesotho
 Liberia
 Presbyterian Church in Liberia
 Lithuania
 Evangelical Reformed Church in Lithuania/Unitas Lithuaniae/Lietuvos Evangeliku Reformatu Baznycia
 Luxembourg
 Protestant Reformed Church of Luxemburg H.B./Protestantisch-Reformierte Kirche von Luxembourg H.B./Eglise Protestante Réformée du Luxembourg
 Madagascar
 Church of Jesus Christ in Madagascar/Eglise de Jésus-Christ à Madagascar/Fiangonan'i Jesoa Kristy eto Madagasikara
 Malawi
 Church of Central Africa Presbyterian
 Church of Central Africa Presbyterian – Harare Synod
 Church of Central Africa Presbyterian – Nkhoma Synod
 Malaysia
 Presbyterian Church Malaysia/Gereja Presbyterian Malaysia
 Marshall Islands
 Reformed Congregational Churches
 United Church of Christ - Congregational in the Marshall Islands/Jarin Parik Dron
 Mauritius
 Presbyterian Church of Mauritius/Eglise presbytérienne de Maurice
 Mexico
 Associate Reformed Presbyterian Church of Mexico/Iglesia Presbiteriana Asociada Reformada de México (IPAR)
 National Presbyterian Church in Mexico, A. R./Iglesia Nacional Presbiteriana de México, A. R.
 Presbyterian Reformed Church of Mexico/Iglesia Presbiteriana Reformada de México
 Morocco
 Evangelical Church in Morocco/Eglise évangélique au Maroc
 Mozambique
 Evangelical Church of Christ in Mozambique/Igreja Evangelica de Cristo em Mocambique
 Presbyterian Church of Mozambique/Igreja Presbiteriana de Moçambique
 Reformed Church in Mozambique/Igreja Reformada em Mocambique
 United Church of Christ in Mozambique/Igreja de Christo Unida em Mocambique (Ex-Missao American Board)
 Myanmar
 Christian Reformed Church in Myanmar
 Evangelical Presbyterian Church in Myanmar
 Independent Presbyterian Church of Myanmar
 Mara Evangelical Church/Evangelical Mission Myanmar/Mara Evangelical Awnanopa
 The Presbyterian Church of Myanmar/Kawlram Presb Kohhran
 Reformed Presbyterian Church in Myanmar
 The Netherlands
 Covenant of Free Evangelical Congregations in the Netherlands
 The Protestant Church in the Netherlands (PCN)/De Protestantse Kerk in Nederland (PKN)
 Remonstrant Brotherhood/Remonstrantse Broederschap
 New Caledonia
 Evangelical Church in New Caledonia and Loyalty Islands/Eglise evangélique en Nouvelle Calédonie et aux Îles Loyauté
 New Zealand
 Niue Niue Church/Ekalesia Niue
 Presbyterian Church of Aotearoa New Zealand
 Niger
 Evangelical Church of the Republic of Niger/Eglise évangélique de la République du Niger/Ekklisiyar Bishara Ta Kasar Niger
 Nigeria
 Christian Reformed Church of Nigeria
 Evangelical Reformed Church of Christ
 Presbyterian Church of Nigeria
 Reformed Church of Christ in Nigeria
 United Church of Christ in Nigeria/Habaddiyar Ekklisiyar Kristi a Nigeria
 Universal Reformed Church of Christ (formerly Church of Christ in the Sudan Among the Tiv/Nongo u Kristu u ken Sudan hen Tiv)
 Pakistan
 Church of Pakistan
 Presbyterian Church of Pakistan
 The Philippines
 Christian Reformed Church in the Philippines
 United Church of Christ in the Philippines
 United Evangelical Church of Christ (Iglesia Evangélica Unida de Cristo)
 Poland
 Reformed Evangelical Church in Poland/Kosciol Ewangelicko-Reformowany w Rzeczypospolitej Polskiej
 Portugal
 Evangelical Presbyterian Church of Portugal/Igreja Evangélica Presbiteriana de Portugal
 Romania
 Reformed Church in Romania (Oradea)/Kiralyhagomelleki Reformatus Egyhazkeruelet (Oradea)
 Reformed Church in Romania - Transylvanian District/Romaniai Reformatus Egyhaz - Erdelyi Egyhazkerület
 Rwanda
 Presbyterian Church in Rwanda/Eglise presbytérienne au Rwanda
 Samoa
 Congregational Christian Church in American Samoa
 Congregational Christian Church in Samoa/Ekalesia Fa' apotopotoga Kerisinao I Samoa
 Senegal
 Protestant Church in Senegal/Eglise protestante du Sénégal
 Serbia, Republic of, and Montenegro, Republic of
 Reformed Christian Church in Serbia and Montenegro/Reformatska Hriscanska Crkva u SFRJ
 Singapore
 Presbyterian Church in Singapore
 Slovakia
 Reformed Christian Church in Slovakia/Reformovaná Krest. Cirkev na Slovensku
 Slovenia
 Reformed Church in Slovenia
 Solomon Islands
 United Church in the Solomon Islands
 South Africa
 Dutch Reformed Church (DRC)/Nederduits Gereformeerde Kerk (NGK)
 Dutch Reformed Church in Africa (DRCA)/(NGKA)
 Dutch Reformed Church of Africa/Nederduitsch Hervormde Kerk van Afrika (NHKA)
 Evangelical Presbyterian Church in South Africa
 Maranatha Reformed Church of Christ
 Peoples Church of Africa/Volkskerk van Afrika
 Presbyterian Church of Africa
 Reformed Church in Africa, South Africa
 United Congregational Church of Southern Africa
 Uniting Presbyterian Church in Southern Africa
 Uniting Reformed Church in Southern Africa/ Verenigende Gereformeerde Kerk in Suider Afrika
 Maranatha Reformed Church of Christ
 South Sudan
 Sudanese Reformed Churches
 Spain
 Spanish Evangelical Church/Iglesia Evangélica Espanola
 Sri Lanka
 Dutch Reformed Church in Sri Lanka
 Presbytery of Lanka
 Sudan
 Presbyterian Church in Sudan
 Africa Inland Church Sudan
 Swaziland
 Swaziland Reformed Church (SRC)
 Sweden
 Uniting Church in Sweden or Equmeniakyrkan (founded 2011 by member church Mission Covenant Church of Sweden and two other denominations)
 Switzerland
 Protestant Church of Switzerland or (Evangelisch-reformierte Kirche Schweiz, Église évangélique réformée de Suisse, Chiesa evangelica riformata in Svizzera, Baselgia evangelica refurmada da la Svizra)
 Tahiti
 Maòhi Protestant Church/Etaretia Evaneria no Porinetia Farani/Église Protestante Maòhi
 Taiwan
 Presbyterian Church in Taiwan/Tâi-oân Ki-tok Tiúⁿ-ló Kàu-hōe
 Thailand
 Church of Christ in Thailand
 Togo
 Evangelical Presbyterian Church of Togo/Eglise évangélique presbytérienne du Togo
 Trinidad and Tobago
 Presbyterian Church in Trinidad and Tobago
 Tuvalu
 Tuvalu Christian Church/Te Ekalesia Kelisiano Tuvalu
 Uganda
 Christian Reformed Church of East Africa
 Reformed Presbyterian Church in Uganda
 Reformed Presbyterian Church in Africa (Uganda)
 Ukraine
 Reformed Church in Sub-Carpathia/ Reformed Church in Transcarpathia/Karpataljai Reformatus Egyhaz
 United Kingdom
 Church of Scotland
 The Presbyterian Church in Ireland
 Presbyterian Church of Wales/Eglwys Bresbyteraidd Cymru
 Union of Welsh Independents/Undeb yr Annibynwyr Cymraeg
 United Free Church of Scotland
 United Reformed Church
 United States of America
 Christian Reformed Church in North America
 Cumberland Presbyterian Church
 Cumberland Presbyterian Church in America
 ECO: A Covenant Order of Evangelical Presbyterians (provisional member)
 Evangelical Presbyterian Church
 Hungarian Reformed Church in America
 Korean Presbyterian Church in America
 Lithuanian Evangelical Reformed Church/Lietuviu Evangeliku Reformatu Baznycia-JAV
 Presbyterian Church (USA)
 Reformed Church in America
 United Church of Christ
 Uruguay
 Waldensian Evangelical Church of the River Plate/Iglesia Evangelica Valdense de Rio de la Plata
 Vanuatu
 Presbyterian Church of Vanuatu/Presbiterian Jyos Blong Vanuatu
 Venezuela
 Presbyterian Church of Venezuela/Iglesia Presbiteriana de Venezuela
 Vietnam
 Presbyterian Church of Vietnam
 Zambia
 Church of Central Africa Presbyterian – Synod of Zambia
 Reformed Church in Zambia
 United Church of Zambia
 Zimbabwe
 Reformed Church in Zimbabwe

See also

List of the largest Protestant denominations

References

External links
 
 CRC to Host Inaugural Meeting of Reformed World Communion

International bodies of Reformed denominations
Christian organizations established in 2010
Calvinist organizations established in the 21st century